The Louisiana Culinary Institute is a for-profit junior culinary college in Baton Rouge, Louisiana. It offers Associate degrees in Culinary Arts and Hospitality and Culinary Management. In 2013, The Cooking Channel hosted a series of "The Freshman Class" program, at the institute, which followed four freshman through their studies.

References

Cooking schools in the United States
Universities and colleges in Baton Rouge, Louisiana
Private universities and colleges in Louisiana
Education in Baton Rouge, Louisiana
Educational institutions established in 2002
2002 establishments in Louisiana
Educational institutions accredited by the Council on Occupational Education
For-profit universities and colleges in the United States